Omiostola triangulifera is a species of moth of the family Tortricidae. It is found in Colombia and Pichincha Province, Ecuador.

Its wingspan is about 27 mm. Its forewings are whitish cream with brownish suffusions and strigulae (fine streaks). Its dorsum is suffused with grey and its costa and apex are rust brown. Its hindwings are brownish.

Etymology
The species name refers to the shape of the dorsal blotch of its forewings and is derived from the Latin terms triangulum (meaning triangle) and fero (meaning "I carry").

References

	

Moths described in 2008
Olethreutini
Taxa named by Józef Razowski